Birdell is an unincorporated community in Randolph County, Arkansas, United States.

The Old Union School in Birdell is listed on the National Register of Historic Places.

References

Unincorporated communities in Randolph County, Arkansas
Unincorporated communities in Arkansas